Traditional Japanese units of measurement or the shakkanhō ("shaku–kan system") is the traditional system of measurement used by the people of the Japanese archipelago. It is largely based on the Chinese system, which spread to Japan and the rest of the Sinosphere in antiquity. It has remained mostly unaltered since the adoption of the measures of the Tang dynasty in 701. Following the 1868 Meiji Restoration, Imperial Japan adopted the metric system and defined the traditional units in metric terms on the basis of a prototype metre and kilogram. The present values of most Korean and Taiwanese units of measurement derive from these values as well.

For a time in the early 20th century, the traditional, metric, and English systems were all legal in Japan. Although commerce has since been legally restricted to using the metric system, the old system is still used in some instances. The old measures are common in carpentry and agriculture, with tools such as chisels, spatels, saws, and hammers manufactured in sun and bu sizes. Floorspace is expressed in terms of tatami mats, and land is sold on the basis of price in tsubo. Sake is sold in multiples of 1gō, with the most common bottle sizes being 4 (720 mL) or 10 (1.8 L, isshōbin).

History
Customary Japanese units are a local adaption of the traditional Chinese system, which was adopted at a very early date. They were imposed and adjusted at various times by local and imperial statutes. The details of the system have varied over time and location in Japan's history.

Japan signed the Treaty of the Metre in 1885, with its terms taking effect in 1886. It received its prototype metre and kilogram from the International Bureau of Weights and Measures in 1890. The next year, a weights and measurements law codified the Japanese system, taking its fundamental units to be the shaku and kan and deriving the others from them. The law codified the values of the traditional and metric units in terms of one another, but retained the traditional units as the formal standard and metric values as secondary.

In 1909, English units were also made legal within the Empire of Japan. Following World War I, the Ministry of Agriculture and Commerce established a Committee for Weights and Measures and Industrial Standards, part of whose remit was to investigate which of Japan's three legal systems should be adopted. Upon its advice, the Imperial Diet established the metric system as Japan's legal standard, effective 1 July 1924, with use of the other systems permitted as a transitional measure. The government and "leading industries" were to convert within the next decade, with others following in the decade after that. Public education—at the time compulsory through primary school—began to teach the metric system. Governmental agencies and the Japanese Weights and Measures Association undertook a gradual course of education and conversion but opposition became vehemently outspoken in the early 1930s. Nationalists decried the "foreign" system as harmful to Japanese pride, language, and culture, as well as restrictive to international trade. In 1933, the government pushed the deadline for the conversion of the first group of industries to 1939; the rest of the country was given until 1954. Emboldened, the nationalists succeeded in having an Investigating Committee for Weights and Measures Systems established. In 1938, it advised that the government should continue to employ the "Shaku–Kan" system alongside the metric one. The next year, the imperial ordinance concerning the transition to the metric system was formally revised, indefinitely exempting real estate and historical objects and treasures from any need for metric conversion. The deadline for compulsory conversion in all other fields was moved back to 31 December 1958.

Following its defeat in World War II, Japan was occupied by America and saw an expanded use of US customary units. Gasoline was sold by the gallon and cloth by the yard. The Diet revisited the nation's measurements and, with the occupation's approval, promulgated a Measurements Law in June 1951 that reaffirmed its intention to continue Japan's metrication, effective on the first day of 1959. An unofficial and ad hoc Metric System Promotion Committee was established by interested scholars, public servants, and businessmen in August 1955, undertaking a public awareness campaign and seeking to accomplish as much of the conversion ahead of schedule as possible. Its first success was the conversion of candy sales in Tokyo department stores from the momme to the gram in September 1956; others followed, with NHK taking the lead in media use.

With the majority of the public now exposed to it since childhood, the metric system became the sole legal measurement system in most fields of Japanese life on 1 January 1959. Redrafting of laws to use metric equivalents had already been accomplished, but conversion of the land registries required until 31 March 1966 to complete. Industry transitioned gradually at its own expense, with compliance sometimes being nominal, as in the case of  screws becoming " screws". Since the original fines for noncompliance were around $140 and governmental agencies mostly preferred to wait for voluntary conversion, metric use by December 1959 was estimated at only 85%. Since research showed that individual Japanese did not intend to actually use the metric units when given other options, however, sale and verification of devices marked with non-metric units (such as rulers and tape measures noting shaku and sun) were criminalised after 1961. 

Some use of the traditional units continues. Some Japanese describe their weight in terms of kan. Homes continue to be reckoned in terms of tsubo, even on the national census as late as 2005, although the practice was discontinued in 2010. English units continue to be employed in aviation, munitions, and various sports, including golf and baseball.

Length 

The base unit of Japanese length is the shaku based upon the Chinese chi, with other units derived from it and changing over time based on its dimensions.

As in China and Korea, Japan employed different shaku for different purposes. The "carpentry" shaku (kanejaku) was used for construction. It was a little longer in the 19th century prior to its metric redefinition. The "cloth" or "whale" shaku (kujirajaku), named for tailors' and fabric merchants' baleen rulers, was  longer and used in measuring cloth. (A longer unit of about 25cloth shaku was the tan.) Traditional Japanese clothing was reckoned using the "traditional clothing" shaku (gofukujaku), about  longer than the carpentry shaku.

The Japanese ri is now much longer than the Chinese or Korean li, comprising 36 chō, 2160 ken, or 12,960shaku. A still longer unit was formerly standard in Ise on Honshu and throughout the 9 provinces of Kyushu, which comprised 50 chō, 3000 ken, or 18,000shaku. The imperial nautical mile of 6080feet (1853.19m) was also formerly used by the Japanese in maritime contexts as a "marine ri". A fourth and shorter ri of about 600m is still evident in some beach names. The "99-Ri" beach at Kujukuri is about 60 km. The "7-Ri" beach at Shichiri is 4.2 km long.

The traditional units are still used for construction materials in Japan. Each sheet is about the size of one tatami mat. The thicknesses of the sheets, however, are usually measured in millimetres. The names of these units also live in the name of the bamboo flute , literally "shaku eight", which measures one shaku and eight sun, and the Japanese version of the Tom Thumb story, literally "one sun boy", as well as in many Japanese proverbs.

Area 

The base unit of Japanese area is the tsubo, equivalent to a square ken or 36 square shaku. It is twice the size of the jō, the area of the Nagoya tatami mat. Both units are used informally in discussing real estate floorspace. Due to historical connections, the tsubo is still used as the official base unit of area in Taiwan.

In agricultural contexts, the tsubo is known as the bu. The larger units remain in common use by Japanese farmers when discussing the sizes of fields.

Volume 

The base unit of Japanese volume is the shō, although the gō now sees more use since it is reckoned as the appropriate size of a serving of rice or sake. Sake bottles are now marketed as containing 1800mL exactly.

The koku is historically important: since it was reckoned as the amount of rice necessary to feed a person for a single year, it was used to compute agricultural output and official salaries. The koku of rice was sometimes reckoned as 3000"sacks". The shakujime of timber was about 12cuft and the taba about 108ft³ ( or ).

Mass

The base unit of Japanese mass is the kan, although the momme is more common. It is a recognised unit in the international pearl industry. In English-speaking countries, momme is typically abbreviated as mo.

The Japanese form of the Chinese tael was the ryō. It was customarily reckoned as around 4 or 10 momme but, because of its importance as a fundamental unit of the silver and gold bullion used as currency in medieval Japan, it varied over time and location from those notional values.

Imperial units
Imperial units are sometimes used in Japan. Feet and inches are used for most non-sport bicycles, whose tyre sizes follow a British system; for sizes of magnetic tape and many pieces of computer hardware; for photograph sizes; and for the sizes of electronic displays for electronic devices. Photographic prints, however, are usually rounded to the nearest millimetre and screens are not described in terms of inches but "type" (gata). For instance, a television whose screen has a 17-inch diagonal is described as a "17-type" and one with a 32-inch widescreen screen is called a "32-vista-type".

See also
Japanese numerals, counter words, currency, & clocks
Heavenly Stems & Earthly Branches
Units, Systems, & History of measurement
Chinese, Taiwanese, Hong Kong, Mongolian, Korean, & Vietnamese units of measurement
Metric system & Metrication

References

Notes

Citations

Bibliography

 .
 , reprinted by the Louisiana State University Press at Baton Rouge in 1991. 
 .
 .
 .
 .

External links
Japanese Carpentry Museum
Japanese units 
Convert traditional Japanese units to metric and imperial units (lengths, areas, volumes, weights) (sci.lang.Japan FAQ pages)
Japanese Measurement to Metric and Imperial Converter for Length/Distance, Area, Volume, Mass/Weight, and Rice Weights 
Simple Japanese Traditional Area Units Converter
Simple Japanese Distance and Length Units Converter

Obsolete units of measurement
Systems of units
Units
Units
Units
Customary units of measurement
Units of measurement by country
Standards of Japan